The Bell Witch Cave is a karst cave located in Adams, Tennessee, near where the Bell Farm once stood.  The cave is approximately 490 feet (150 m) long.  The cave is privately owned, and tours are given during the summer months and in October.

This cave has been associated with the haunting of the Bell Witch, a period during which the Bell family was allegedly haunted by an entity now referred to as the "Bell Witch." The cave is located on property once owned by the Bell family. Many believe that when the witch departed the family, she fled to the sanctuary of this cave.

In the particular legend in which the cave is featured, young Betsy Bell and some of her friends had gone to explore the cave.  While they were there, one of the boys crawled into a hole and became stuck.  A voice cried out, "I'll get him out!" The boy felt hands grasping his feet, and he was pulled out of the hole. The supposed entity (still invisible), then gave the young explorers a lecture on reckless cave exploring.

References

External links
  - Official site
  - Information about the Bell Witch story and the cave.
  - Cool Video  

Caves of Tennessee
Show caves in the United States
Limestone caves
Landforms of Robertson County, Tennessee
American witchcraft
National Register of Historic Places in Tennessee
Tourist attractions in Robertson County, Tennessee
Reportedly haunted locations in Tennessee
National Register of Historic Places in Robertson County, Tennessee